Dr. Shailendra Mohan Singhal is a leader of Bharatiya Janata Party from Uttarakhand. He served as member of the Vidhan Sabha representing Jaspur. He was elected from Jaspur in 2002, 2007 and 2012 state elections in Uttarakhand. He was a member of the Indian National Congress until he joined Bharatiya Janata Party aftermath of Uttarakhand political crisis.

References

People from Udham Singh Nagar district
1960 births
Living people
Bharatiya Janata Party politicians from Uttarakhand
Members of the Uttarakhand Legislative Assembly
Indian National Congress politicians